The Rubery International Book Award (founded in 2010 by Heather Painter) is the largest cash award for books published by independent publishers and self published authors in Great Britain. The London Review of Books described it as "independent publishing's response to the Booktrust and the Orange Prize. The Alliance of Independent Authors describes the award as: 'holders of the respected Rubery Award [...] should be considered to have a quality endorsement.'  

In 2012, the award attracted submissions from five continents. In 2015 entries were received from twenty different countries around the world: Australia, Canada, China, Finland, Germany, Ghana, Greece, Ireland, Israel, Japan, New Zealand, Nigeria, Norway, Portugal, Saudi Arabia, Spain, Sweden, Switzerland, UK, and USA.

Judges

Current and prior judges include Booker shortlisted author Clare Morrall; publisher of Tindal Street Press Alan Mahar; judge for the international Arthur C. Clarke Award Pauline Morgan; American literature and Creative Writing lecturer, Paul McDonald; Poet and Stand winner Jeff Phelps, Gaynor Arnold who was longlisted for the Booker Prize and the Orange Prize (now the Bailey's); short story writer and novelist, Judith Allnatt; children's authors, Ann Evans and  Simon Cheshire; creative writing teacher and previously Birmingham's Poet Laureate, Chris Morgan; William Gallagher, author, dramatist, and lecturer who writes Doctor Who audio dramas, stage plays, and has British journalism experience; and literary agent Laura Longrigg.

Successes
 Jacob M Appel who won First Prize in 2013 has had many short stories published in literary journals. He also won Dundee International Book Prize which published his debut novel, The Man Who Wouldn't Stand Up.
 Angela Readman who won Book of the Year 2015 has had much success; winning the Saboteur Awards 2015;  the Costa Short Story Award in 2013 and shortlisted for the Edgehill Prize 2016.
 Melanie Whipman, who won the 2012 short story competition for her story "Peacock Girl", has had stories subsequently read on BBC Radio 4. She has also been listed for the Edgehill Prize for 2017.

Winners

Short Story Winners
 Sarah Evans "The Tipping Point" (2011)
 Melanie Whipman "Peacock Girl" (2012) 
 Gill Blow "On the Bench" (2013)
 Gregory J Wolos "Still Life" (2014)

References

External links
 Official website

English literary awards
English-language literary awards
Awards established in 2010
2010 establishments in the United Kingdom